The degree of Technicien supérieur de l'aviation (TSA, in English Advanced Technician Degree in Aviation) is a certification created in 2010 from the Technicien supérieur des études et de l'exploitation de l'aviation civile certification. It is a title, recognized by CNCP, and recorder level III into the National Classification of Levels of Training. The degree is obtain after a training at the École nationale de l'aviation civile (French civil aviation university).

Application 
Students can apply to this training by :
 A competitive examination organized by ENAC each year;
 A Validation des Acquis de l'Experience procedure.

Training at ENAC 
TSA students are admitted into one of these two options :
 « TSA Fonctionnaires » ( « civil servant TSA »), after the training they integrate the corps of the Technicien supérieur des études et de l'exploitation de l'aviation civile.
 « TSA Civils » (« civilians TSA »)

The choice is made by ranking at the competitive examination. The two options have the same curriculum. The civil servants have a dual education system before integrate the TSEEAC.

Jobs 
 Civil servants : they join  the corps of the Technicien supérieur des études et de l'exploitation de l'aviation civile at the Directorate General for Civil Aviation.
 Civilians : they can have a job into an airport or an airline to do :
 Ground handling services: air freight or passengers;
 Air operations: flight preparation and management of flight crews;
 Other missions of training, audit and expertise in aviation ...

Bibliography 
 Ariane Gilotte, Jean-Philippe Husson et Cyril Lazerge, 50 ans d'Énac au service de l'aviation, Édition S.E.E.P.P, 1999

See also 
 Technicien supérieur des études et de l'exploitation de l'aviation civile (TSEEAC)
 Technicien Supérieur de l'Aviation (civilian) (TSA civilian)

External links 
 TSA training on ENAC website

References 

Professional titles and certifications
Occupations in aviation
Air traffic control
École nationale de l'aviation civile
Aviation licenses and certifications